Albert Karl Werkmüller (born 31 December 1879 in Berlin, date of death unknown) was a German track and field athlete who competed at the 1900 Summer Olympics in Paris, France.

Werkmüller competed in the 200 metres. He placed either fourth in his four-man first round (semifinals) heat and did not qualify for the final.

References

External links

 De Wael, Herman. Herman's Full Olympians: "Athletics 1900". Accessed 18 March 2006.
 

1879 births
Year of death missing
German male sprinters
Olympic athletes of Germany
Athletes (track and field) at the 1900 Summer Olympics
Athletes from Berlin
Place of death missing